Roshni Chopra is an Indian actress, television presenter and the winner of NDTV Imagine's reality show, Dil Jeetegi Desi Girl. She is also known for playing the role of Pia one of the three female leads in the Zee TV series Kasamh Se.

Career
She is best known for playing the role of Pia one of the three female leads and the younger sister of protagonist Bani Walia in Kasamh Se on Zee TV. An alumnus of the Our Own English High School, she was also the presenter of the pre and post-match cricket show on Doordarshan known as Fourth Umpire. Chopra was also one of the three hosts of the Indian variant of Got Talent series known as, India's Got Talent in 2009.

Chopra starred in Vikram Bhatt's film, Phhir, which released on 12 August 2011. She has hosted the show Comedy Circus Teen Ka Tadka on Sony TV in 2009–10, and is currently the anchor of 'Heroes – Moments and Memories' on Star Sports. She also made an appearance in Maut Ka Khel, an episode of the horror TV series, Aahat on Sony TV. She also worked in Comedy Nights With Kapil on Colors.

She was seen in the show Pyaar Mein Twist which aired on Star Plus from 29 January 2011.

Personal life
Chopra's younger sister, Deeya Chopra is also an actress. Chopra is married to film-maker Siddharth Anand Kumar. She gave birth to her first child, a son named Jaiveer on 5 November 2012. She gave birth to her second son Reyaan on 18 August 2016.

Filmography

Films

Television

References

External links

Living people
Indian television actresses
Indian stage actresses
Indian film actresses
Actresses in Hindi cinema
Indian women television presenters
Indian television presenters
Actresses from Mumbai
Female models from Delhi
21st-century Indian actresses
Bigg Boss contestants
Actresses from Delhi
Year of birth missing (living people)